Longville Municipal Airport  is a city-owned public-use airport located one nautical mile (1.85 km) northeast of the central business district of Longville, a city in Cass County, Minnesota, United States.

Although most U.S. airports use the same three-letter location identifier for the FAA and IATA, this airport is assigned XVG by the FAA but has no designation from the IATA.

Facilities and aircraft 
It has one runway designated 13/31 with an asphalt surface measuring 3,781 by 75 feet (1,152 x 23 m).

For the 12-month period ending August 31, 2005, the airport had 6,725 aircraft operations, an average of 18 per day: 99.6% general aviation and 0.4% air taxi. At that time there were 8 aircraft based at this airport: 87.5% single-engine and 12.5% multi-engine.

References

External links 
 Aerial photo as of 3 May 1992 from USGS The National Map
 

Airports in Minnesota
Buildings and structures in Cass County, Minnesota
Transportation in Cass County, Minnesota